Carbonea austroshetlandica is a species of lichenicolous fungus belonging to the family Lecanoraceae. It was discovered in the South Shetland Islands where it grows on Carbonea assentiens but has since been reported from King George Island where it uses Rhizocarpon geographicum as a host.

Description
Carbonea austroshetlandica has dispersed to aggregated ascomata, which are up to 0.3 mm in diameter, abruptly becoming convex with excluded margin. Hypothecium and exciple are dark brown and the epihymenium is greenish. The hymenium is hyaline, 35–48 μm high and stains blue with KI solution. Paraphyses are branched and anastomosing, slightly enlarged at the apex. Asci are broadly ellipsoid, 28–32 × 15–16 μm. Ascospores hyaline, ellipsoid, simple, 9–10 × 3.5–4.5 μm.

Ecology
Carbonea austroshetlandica is a parasite or saprobe, unlike the similar Carbonea aggregantula which is has a symbiotic relationship with its host.

References

Lecanoraceae
Lichen species
Lichens described in 2018
Lichens of the subantarctic islands